Pape Abou Cissé (born 14 September 1995) is a Senegalese professional footballer who plays as a centre back for Greek Super League club Olympiacos and the Senegal national team. He began his career in Senegal with AS Pikine and then played for French Ligue 2 club Ajaccio.

Club career
A youth international for Senegal, he is a youth product of AS Pikine. After a trial, Cissé joined Ajaccio in early 2015 as a trainee professional. He made his professional debut in a Ligue 2 draw against Valenciennes in April 2015, playing the entire game. He went on to make 71 appearances in the French second tier.

In 2017, he joined Olympiacos as a pre-contract signing. On 14 October 2017, he scored his first goal with Olympiacos, after an assist from Kostas Fortounis in a 4–3 away win against Panionios. Benfica were reportedly interested in signing the player in the January 2018 transfer window.

Cissé scored an injury-time equaliser for Olympiacos against Panathiniakos in the first derby of the 2018–19 Superleague Greece season. He was included in UEFA's Europa League Breakthrough Team for 2018: the citation described him as having a "towering presence in the Olympiacos back line, allied to deceptive pace and a great awareness [and] also a threat from set pieces." On 12 February 2020, Pape Abou Cisse scored a quick-fire double to quash Lamia’s stubborn challenge and secure Olympiacos’ qualification for the Greek Cup semi-finals, in a thrilling 3–2 home win game. On 27 February 2020, scored with a stooping header from a corner-kick, when French international Mathieu Valbuena curling over a dangerous delivery into the heart of the Arsenal's penalty area in a glorious 2–1 away win in London for the Europa League Round of 32, 2nd leg. He has been included in the UEFA Europa League Team of the Week.

On 30 January 2021, Senegalese international defender Pape Cissé will be loaned by Olympiakos to Saint-Étienne with an option to buy. The former player of AS Pikine has the opportunity to bounce back in a historic French club which can keep him against €13 million.  

On 19 August 2021, he scored after Aguibou Camara did not manage to beat the goalkeeper of Slovan, sealing a thriumphic 3-0 home win 2021–22 UEFA Europa League playoffs 1st round game against ŠK Slovan Bratislava.  On 4 December 2021, with two goals by Cisse (24 ', 49') Olympiakos defeated OFI in Theodoros Vardinogiannis Stadium, sealing a vital away win in his club effort to win the championship.  On 12 December 2021, he was the only scorer after Rony Lopes's assist in a 1-0 home win game against Aris F.C.

International career
Cissé represented the Senegal U20s at the 2015 African U-20 Championship in 2015.

On 24 August 2018, he received his first senior call-up, for the 2019 Africa Cup of Nations qualifier match against Madagascar on 9 September 2018. He made his senior debut on 13 October 2018, in another qualifier at home to Sudan, and scored the only goal of the match. Cisse performances in 2021 Africa Cup of Nations, after replaced Napoli star Kalidou Koulibaly, who tested positive for coronavirus, in the Lions of Teranga's first two Afcon matches against Zimbabwe and Guinea are outstanding, attracted the interest of many European clubs.

Career statistics

Club

International

Scores and results list Senegal's goal tally first, score column indicates score after each Cissé goal.

Honours
Olympiacos
Super League Greece: 2019–20, 2021–22
Greek Cup: 2019–20

Senegal
Africa Cup of Nations: 2021; runner-up: 2019
Senegal U20
Africa U-20 Championship runner-up: 2015

Individual
UEFA Europa League Breakthrough XI: 2018
Super League Greece Player of the Month: December 2021
Super League Greece Team of the Year: 2021–22

References

External links
 
 

1995 births
Living people
Association football defenders
Senegalese footballers
Senegal international footballers
AS Pikine players
AC Ajaccio players
Olympiacos F.C. players
AS Saint-Étienne players
Senegal Premier League players
Ligue 2 players
Super League Greece players
Ligue 1 players
2019 Africa Cup of Nations players
2021 Africa Cup of Nations players
2022 FIFA World Cup players
Africa Cup of Nations-winning players
Senegalese expatriate footballers
Expatriate footballers in France
Expatriate footballers in Greece
Senegalese expatriate sportspeople in France
Senegalese expatriate sportspeople in Greece